The following page lists all power stations in Finland.

Non-renewable

Nuclear

Fossil fuel

Renewable

Biomass and peat

Hydroelectric

See also 

Energy in Finland
Energy policy of Finland
Electricity sector in Finland
List of power stations in Europe
List of largest power stations in the world

References

Finland

Power stations